The 1997–98 season was the 118th season of competitive football by Rangers.

Overview
Rangers played a total of 52 competitive matches during the 1997–98 season. They went into the season in pursuit of a record tenth consecutive league title. The early season form of new signing Marco Negri gave the team fresh impetus but when the then manager Walter Smith announced that he would leave the club at the end of the season the side's form dipped. Rangers finished the league on 72 points, two behind champions Celtic.

The club ended the season trophyless for the first time in twelve seasons as they lost the Scottish Cup final to Hearts 2–1 and were knocked out League Cup in the quarter finals by Dundee United.

In Europe, the club failed to reach the Champions League group stages and fell at the first hurdle in the UEFA Cup, losing both legs 2–1 to RC Strasbourg.

Transfers

In

Out

Expendure:  £14,450,000
Income:  £4,850,000
Total loss/gain:  £9,600,000

Results
All results are written with Rangers' score first.

Scottish Premier Division

UEFA Champions League

UEFA Cup

League Cup

Scottish Cup

Appearances

League table

References 

Rangers F.C. seasons
Rangers